Severomuysk (Khoyto-Muyayn) is an urban locality (an urban-type settlement) in Muysky District of the Republic of Buryatia, Russia, located about  southwest of the urban-type settlement of Taksimo, the administrative center of the district. As of the 2010 Census, its population was 2,198.

Geography
Severomuysk lies directly adjacent to the eastern portal of the Severomuysky rail tunnel, in the valley of the Muyakan River, a left-hand tributary of the Muya River. The valley is bounded to the north by the Severomuysky Range, which is part of the greater Stanovoy Range.

History
It was granted urban-type settlement status in 1977. As the construction of the tunnel turned out to be more difficult than anticipated, construction was prolonged over twenty years and Severomuysk remained the logistical center for tunnel construction works for far longer than originally intended. With the economic downturn of the 1990s and the completion of the tunnel in 2003, the settlement lost over two thirds of its population.

Administrative and municipal status
Within the framework of administrative divisions, the urban-type settlement (inhabited locality) of Severomuysk is incorporated within Muysky District as Severomuysk Urban-Type Settlement (an administrative division of the district). As a municipal division, Severomuysk Urban-Type Settlement is incorporated within Muysky Municipal District as Severomuyskoye Urban Settlement.

Economy and infrastructure
The only real source of employment in the settlement is the maintenance of the Severomuysky Tunnel and its associated bypass route.

References

Notes

Sources

Urban-type settlements in Buryatia
Populated places in Muysky District